Pellenes brevis is a species of jumping spider in the genus Pellenes. Initially named Attus brevis, the species was first identified in 1878 in France and Spain. It has subsequently been found in many countries in southern Europe and western Asia from Portugal to Iran. The spider is very dark brown or black, with a distinctive white semi-circle marking on the abdomen. It lays its eggs in snail shells.

Taxonomy
Originally allocated to the genus Attus as Attus brevis, the species was first identified by Eugène Simon in 1868. It was moved by Simon to the genus Pellenes in 1878.

Description
The spider has a very dark brown or black body with a slight golden tinge. The abdomen is black, with a white semi-circle marking at the front. It has black thighs and brown legs, the front legs looking swollen and the third legs thin and long.

The species is similar to other members of genus, differing in details. For example, it can be differentiated from Pellenes allegrii by the size of the embolus in the male and the shape and size of the central blind-ending pocket in the female, and from Pellenes pseudobrevis by the female genitalia and male pedipalps.

Distribution
Pellenes brevis has an extensive range across southern Europe into western Asia. It was first identified in Auvergne and Vaucluse in France and Guadarrama in Spain. The species has been subsequently found across Europe in Cyprus, Germany, Greece, Italy, Macedonia, Portugal, Turkey and Ukraine. Other examples have been found in Bulgaria and Poland. It was the twenty-first species in the genus to be identified in the ex-Soviet Union. The furthest East that is has been found is in Crimea and Tehran, Iran.

Habits
The species is known to lay, and guard, its eggs in snail shells.

References

Citations

Bibiliography

Arthropods of Iran
Arthropods of Turkey
Fauna of North Macedonia
Invertebrates of Cyprus
Salticidae
Spiders described in 1868
Spiders of Europe
Taxa named by Eugène Simon